KEYE (1400 AM) is a country music formatted radio station licensed to serve Perryton, Texas. The station is owned by Perryton Radio, Inc.

References

External links

EYE
Radio stations established in 1948
1948 establishments in Texas
Country radio stations in the United States